The 1952 United States presidential election in Maine took place on November 4, 1952, as part of the 1952 United States presidential election which was held throughout all contemporary 48 states. Voters chose five representatives, or electors to the Electoral College, who voted for president and vice president.

Maine overwhelmingly voted for the Republican nominee, General Dwight D. Eisenhower of New York, over the Democratic nominee, former Governor Adlai Stevenson of Illinois. Eisenhower ran with Senator Richard Nixon of California, while Stevenson's running mate was Senator John Sparkman of Alabama.

Eisenhower won Maine by a margin of 32.28%.

Results

Results by county

See also
 United States presidential elections in Maine

Notes

References

Maine
1952
1952 Maine elections